Civetone is a macrocyclic ketone and the main odorous constituent of civet oil. It is a pheromone sourced from the African civet. It has a strong musky odor that becomes pleasant at extreme dilutions. Civetone is closely related to muscone, the principal odoriferous compound found in musk; the structure of both compounds was elucidated by Leopold Ružička. Today, civetone can be synthesized from precursor chemicals found in palm oil.

Uses 
Civetone is used as a perfume fixative and flavor.

In order to attract jaguars to camera traps, field biologists have used the cologne Calvin Klein's Obsession For Men. It is believed that the civetone in the cologne resembles a territorial marking.

See also
 5-Cyclohexadecenone, a related musk chemical

References 

Perfume ingredients
Macrocycles
Mammalian pheromones
Cycloalkenes
Ketones